The shovelers  or shovellers  are four species of dabbling ducks with long, broad spatula-shaped beaks:
 Red shoveler, Anas platalea
 Cape shoveler, Anas smithii
 Australasian shoveler, Anas rhynchotis
 Northern shoveler, Anas clypeata

References
Clements, James, (2007) The Clements Checklist of the Birds of the World, Cornell University Press, Ithaca

Ducks
Birds by common name